Portal is a country house standing to the northeast of the village of Tarporley, Cheshire, England.  It was built in 1900–05.  The architect was Walter E. Tower, nephew and partner of the stained glass designer and manufacturer C. E. Kempe.  It is a timber-framed building in Domestic Revival (Black-and-white Revival) style.  The house is recorded in the National Heritage List for England as a designated Grade II* listed building.  The architectural historian Nikolaus Pevsner says of it: "It is a tour de force in accurate but scaled-up imitation of timber-framed mansions".

See also

Grade II* listed buildings in Cheshire West and Chester
Listed buildings in Tarporley

References

Country houses in Cheshire
Buildings and structures completed in 1905
Grade II* listed buildings in Cheshire
Grade II* listed houses
Timber framed buildings in Cheshire
1905 establishments in England
Tarporley